Blair Macaulay (born June 27, 1988) is a Canadian ice hockey player. He currently plays for the Tulsa Oilers in the Central Hockey League (CHL).

For his outstanding play during the 2012-13 season, Macaulay was selected as the CIS West men's hockey most valuable player for the second straight year, and was also named to the CIS All-Canadian First Team.

On September 4, 2013, the Bakersfield Condors of the ECHL announced that brothers Blair and Scott Macaulay were both signed to play the 2013–14 season.  After just 1 game with the Condors, Macaulay was released and moved to the CHL with the Tulsa Oilers, alongside Scott.

Awards and honours

References

External links

1988 births
Living people
Bakersfield Condors (1998–2015) players
Canadian ice hockey left wingers
Saskatoon Blades players
Ice hockey people from Winnipeg
Tri-City Americans players
Tulsa Oilers (1992–present) players
Canadian expatriate ice hockey players in the United States